FC Obod Tashkent is an Uzbekistani football club based in Tashkent.

History
The club was formed in 2012 and started to play in Uzbekistan Second League. Since 2013 the club played in Uzbekistan First League. In 2014 Obod finished third in League. Year later in 2015, the club won the First League and was promoted to the highest tier, Uzbek League, for the 2016 season.

League history 

In 2014–2015 seasons the league position and match statistics after championship round.

Honours
 Uzbekistan First League (1): 
 2015

Managerial history

References
FC Obod- Official website
The team's squad in 2010

Association football clubs established in 2012
Football clubs in Uzbekistan
2012 establishments in Uzbekistan
Football clubs in Tashkent